Agony is a Colombian metal band formed in Bogotá in 1992.

History
The band was founded by guitarists Ernesto Robayo and Andrés Jaramillo, two high school friends that shared a common interest in heavy metal. Once in college, Ernesto met Alfonso Pinzón, who became the drummer and in turn invited fellow classmate bassist Héctor Lozano. Ernesto Velasco joined in last, after auditioning to become the lead singer. This original configuration of the band recorded the self-titled demo tape in 1994, with seven songs. The demo tape quickly spread among Bogotá's metal fans after its release. The band participated in the first version of the Bogotá rock festival that became Rock al Parque. Founding member Ernesto Robayo and Ernesto Velasco both left the band by the end of 1994, and were replaced by Carlos Marín (guitar) and César Botero (lead singer), respectively. This incarnation of the band created a reputation of strong and fierce live shows. Some of the songs from this time were captured in the first live album published by a Colombian band, Live All the Time in 1995, featuring two cover songs: Pantera's "Strength Beyond Strength" and Sepultura's "Propaganda".

Agony's first studio album, entitled Millennium, was recorded at Audiovision studios in Bogotá, released in 1996 and later re-released in 2006, with César Botero on vocals, Andrés Jaramillo and Carlos Marín on guitars, Carlos Reyes on bass, and Alfonso Pinzón on drums. Agony opened for several international bands in Colombia, including Testament in 1998. In 1999, the band relocated to Los Angeles, California, to record a new album and widen their fan base worldwide. Shortly after relocation, Reyes left the band and returned to Colombia. After the first show in American ground, at the famous Whisky a Go Go in Hollywood, and with Juanes filling in for Reyes on bass, Marín left the band.

Their second album, Reborn, was recorded at Cornerstone Recorders with producer Tom Fletcher, mixed by Rich Renken and released in 2002 on Sum Records. Agony went into hiatus in 2002, after Botero left the band, and reunited in 2007. In 2004, Jaramillo and Pinzón created Dia de los Muertos. Agony performed in the world's largest 'free of charge' rock festival Rock al Parque festival several times, headlining the metal day on its first editions: 1995, 1996, 1997, 1998 and 2002, the last one with Static-X's Tony Campos on bass; last time the performend on Rock al Parque was in 2007 when they headlined the festival alongside Brujeria.

Agony's third album, The Devil's Breath, with Cello Dias on bass and mixed by Logan Mader, was released online in 2009. To date, their last show was on 6 December 2009, in Bogotá alongside Venom.

Discography
Agony (demo album, self-released, 1994)
Live All the Time (live album, Bizarre Gods, 1995)
Millennium (studio album, Cinismo Records, 1996)
Reborn (studio album, Sum Records, 2002)
The Devil's Breath (studio album, Cinismo Records, 2009)

Appearances in compilations
"Snake Land" on From Colombia with Hate Vol. 1 (Sylphorium Records, 1999)
"Scared" on Death Knell (Eternal Night Records, 2002)

References

Colombian heavy metal musical groups
Colombian thrash metal musical groups
Speed metal musical groups
Musical groups established in 1992
Musical groups from Bogotá
Combat Records artists
English-language singers from Colombia